2072 Kosmodemyanskaya, provisional designation , is a stony asteroid from the inner regions of the asteroid belt, approximately 6 kilometers in diameter.

The asteroid was discovered on 31 August 1973, by Russian astronomer Tamara Smirnova at Crimean Astrophysical Observatory, Nauchnyj, on the Crimean peninsula. It was named after Lyubov Kosmodemyanskaya, mother of Soviet heroes Zoya and Aleksandr.

Classification and orbit 

Kosmodemyanskaya orbits the Sun in the inner main-belt at a distance of 2.1–2.9 AU once every 3 years and 10 months (1,402 days). Its orbit has an eccentricity of 0.16 and an inclination of 5° with respect to the ecliptic.

Its first used observation is a precovery taken at Palomar Observatory in 1956, extending the body's observation arc by 17 years prior to the official discovery observation at Nauchnyj.

Physical characteristics 

Kosmodemyanskaya has been characterized as a stony S-type asteroid.

Lightcurves 

The first rotational lightcurve was obtained by American astronomer Richard P. Binzel during a photometric survey of small main-belt asteroids in the 1980s. It showed a rotation period of 4.4 hours with a brightness variation of 0.09 magnitude. In November 2004, another lightcurve of Kosmodemyanskaya was obtained by French amateur astronomer Laurent Bernasconi. Lightcurve analysis gave a period of 10 hours with an amplitude of 0.05 magnitude.

Diameter and albedo 

According to the survey carried out by NASA's Wide-field Infrared Survey Explorer with its subsequent NEOWISE mission, Kosmodemyanskaya measures 4.843 kilometers in diameter and its surface has an exceptionally high albedo of 0.522, while the Collaborative Asteroid Lightcurve Link assumes a standard albedo for stony asteroids of 0.20 and calculates a diameter of 8.93 kilometers with an absolute magnitude of 12.61.

Naming 

This minor planet was named in memory of social worker Lyubov Kosmodemyanskaya (1900–1978), mother of Soviet heroes Zoya Kosmodemyanskaya and Aleksandr Kosmodemyansky. The minor planets 1793 Zoya and 1977 Shura, pet name for Aleksandr, were named after the two. The official naming citation was published by the Minor Planet Center on 1 April 1980.

References

External links 
 Asteroid Lightcurve Database (LCDB), query form (info )
 Dictionary of Minor Planet Names, Google books
 Asteroids and comets rotation curves, CdR – Observatoire de Geneve, Raoul Behrend
 Discovery Circumstances: Numbered Minor Planets (1)-(5000)  – Minor Planet Center
 
 

002072
Discoveries by Tamara Mikhaylovna Smirnova
Named minor planets
19730831